Dino Roberto Gardner (born June 18, 1993) is a Canadian soccer player.

Early career
Gardner started his career with five years in the Wallace Emerson House League. He played than in the youth teams of Wexford SC and was part of the local Ontario Under 16 squad.

Professional career
He spent some time in the Canadian Soccer League with the Toronto FC Academy. In 2011, he left Toronto FC and joined fellow CSL team York Region Shooters.

In 2012, he joined NASL club FC Edmonton, signing a one year contract with an option. where he made two appearances in 2012. At the end of the season, after only playing two games for FC Edmonton, he was released.

He then signed with Atak Sports. In 2014, he returned to his former club the York Region Shooters.

Afterwards, he attended Humber College playing for the men's soccer team.

International career 
Gardner played two games for the U-18 and one game for the Canadian U-20.

Personal life 
He attended the Humberside Collegiate Institute and played until his graduating 2011 Basketball and Soccer for the Huskies. His parents immigrated in the late 80s from Jamaica, his father, David, was a former Jamaican footballer from Manchester, Jamaica and his mother, Elaine, was a high jumper Elaine, who was originally from St. Mary, Jamaica.

References

1993 births
Living people
Association football defenders
Black Canadian soccer players
Canada men's youth international soccer players
Canadian people of Jamaican descent
Canadian Soccer League (1998–present) players
Canadian soccer players
FC Edmonton players
North American Soccer League players
Soccer players from Toronto
Toronto FC players
York Region Shooters players